Haider Khan is a Pakistani politician who is member-elect of the Gilgit Baltistan Assembly.

Political career
Khan contested 2020 Gilgit-Baltistan Assembly election on 15 November 2020 from constituency GBA-17 (Diamer-III) on the ticket of Pakistan Tehreek-e-Insaf. He won the election by the margin of 227 votes over the runner up Rehmat Khaliq of Jamiat Ulema-e-Islam (F). He garnered 5,389 votes while Khaliq received 5,162 votes.

References

Living people
Gilgit-Baltistan MLAs 2020–2025
Politicians from Gilgit-Baltistan
Year of birth missing (living people)